is a city located in Yamanashi Prefecture, Japan. , the city had an estimated population of 30,835 in 13126 households, and a population density of 970 persons per km².

Geography
Chūō is located near the geographic center of the Kōfu Plateau of central Yamanashi Prefecture, hence its name which means "centre" in Japanese. The Fuji River flows through the city.

Surrounding municipalities
Yamanashi Prefecture
Kōfu
Minami-Alps
Shōwa
Ichikawamisato

Climate
The city has a climate characterized by hot and humid summers, and relatively mild winters (Köppen climate classification Cfa).  The average annual temperature in Chūō is 14.6 °C. The average annual rainfall is 1339 mm with September as the wettest month. The temperatures are highest on average in August, at around 26.8 °C, and lowest in January, at around 2.9 °C.

Demographics
Per Japanese census data, the population of Chūō has recently plateaued after several decades of growth.

History
The modern city of Chūō was established on February 20, 2006, from the merger of the towns of Tamaho and Tatomi (both from Nakakoma District), and the village of Toyotomi (from Higashiyatsushiro District).

Government
Chūō has a mayor-council form of government with a directly elected mayor and a unicameral city legislature of 18 members.

Economy
The economy of Chūō is dominated by agriculture, with rice, corn and tomatoes as the major cash crops.

Education
University of Yamanashi – Medical School campus
Chūō has six public elementary schools and three public middle schools operated by the city government. The city does not have any high schools.

Transportation

Railway
 Central Japan Railway Company -  Minobu Line
   -

Highway
  Chūō Expressway

Notable people from Chūō, Yamanashi
 Hidehiro Sugai, Japanese footballer currently playing as a left-back for Ventforet Kofu of J2 League as a designated special player
 Masao Inoue, Japanese professional wrestler (Pro Wrestling Noah)
 Shingo Takagi, Japanese professional wrestler (New Japan Pro-Wrestling)

References

External links

Official Website 

 
Cities in Yamanashi Prefecture